J.T. Tuimoloau (born May 10, 2003) is an American college football defensive end for the Ohio State Buckeyes.

Early life and high school career
Tuimoloau grew up in Edgewood, Washington and attended Eastside Catholic School in Sammamish, Washington. He was rated a five-star recruit and committed to play college football at Ohio State University over offers from USC, Washington, and Oregon. He was also offered a basketball scholarship at Oregon.

College career
Tuimolau played in all 13 of Ohio State's games during his freshman year. He finished the season with 17 tackles, 4.5 tackles for loss, and 2.5 sacks. Tuimolau also considered playing basketball at Ohio State, but ultimately opted to focus on football.

On October 29, 2022 against Penn State, he had two interceptions, two sacks, a forced fumble, and a fumble recovery. He became the first player to accomplish this in an FBS game in the 21st century.

References

External links
 Ohio State Buckeyes bio

Living people
American football defensive ends
Ohio State Buckeyes football players
People from Pierce County, Washington
Players of American football from Washington (state)
Year of birth missing (living people)